Sarah Sellers (née Callister, born July 10, 1991) is an American long-distance runner.

Running career

College career
Sellers ran at Weber State University from 2009 to 2012 where she was a nine-time Big Sky Conference champion, before a stress fracture of her left navicular bone forced her to cut her college career short. Her primary collegiate events were the 5K and 10K, while also competing in cross-country.

International career
In her marathon debut, she won the Huntsville Marathon in Utah to qualify for the 2018 Boston Marathon.  At the 2018 Boston Marathon, she finished second to earn $75,000.

Her coach is Paul Pilkington (a marathon runner who won the LA marathon even though he was a pacer). The NYRR announced on May 8, 2018 that Sarah Sellers will be running in the NYRR Mini 10k race in Central Park at 8am on June 9, 2018.

Sellers placed 18th in a personal best time at 2018 New York City Marathon.

Sellers placed 19th in 2019 Boston Marathon.

Sellers placed second in 2022 Grandma's Marathon in 2:25:43 behind winner Dakotah Lindwurm.

Personal life
Sellers' full-time job is as a certified registered nurse anesthetist (CRNA) in a Tucson-based hospital. Her husband is a resident orthopedic surgeon. They live in Tucson, Arizona.

References

External links
 
 

Living people
American female long-distance runners
American female marathon runners
Weber State University alumni
1991 births
21st-century American women